Ferwerderadiel is a former municipality of Friesland in the northern Netherlands. Its official name is West Frisian, the Dutch name is Ferwerderadeel. In 2019 it merged with the municipalities of Dongeradeel and Kollumerland en Nieuwkruisland to form the new municipality Noardeast-Fryslân.

Population centres 
Bartlehiem, Blije, Burdaard, Ferwert, Ginnum, Hallum, Hegebeintum, Jannum, Jislum, Lichtaard, Marrum, Reitsum, Wânswert, Westernijtsjerk.

Topography

'Dutch topographic map of the municipality of Ferwerderadiel, June 2015

Notable people 

 Saint Frederick of Hallum (ca. 1113 – 1175) a Premonstratensian priest
 Barthold Douma van Burmania (1695 in Hallum – 1766) a Dutch statesman and ambassador to the court of Vienna
 Pieter Boeles (1795 in Ferwerd – 1875) a Dutch Minister and linguist
 Gerardus Heymans (1857 in Ferwert – 1930) a Dutch philosopher, psychologist and academic
 Watse Cuperus (1891 in Blije – 1966) a Dutch journalist and writer in the West Frisian language
 Eeltsje Boates Folkertsma (1893 in Ferwert – 1968) a West Frisian language writer
 Maria Sterk (born 1979 in Hallum) a Dutch marathon speed skater

Gallery

References

External links 
 
Official website

Noardeast-Fryslân
Former municipalities of Friesland
Municipalities of the Netherlands disestablished in 2019